This is a list of events in British radio during 2008.

Events

January
11 January – Birdsong Radio launches on the Digital One platform following the closure of Oneword. The station features the recording of birdsong, a device first employed in 1992 as a test transmission for Classic FM.
12 January – 
100.7 Heart FM breakfast presenter Sarah-Jane Mee announces she will leave the show to join Sky News in London. She presented her final programme on 6 March.
The Forces Station BFBS begins a trial period of broadcasting nationwide across the UK on DAB from midnight. The trial ran until 23:59 on 31 March 2008, and audience research carried out during this time concluded that it was successful. BFBS subsequently returned to DAB Digital Radio permanently.
 29 January – Bauer completes its purchase of Emap's radio, television and consumer media businesses, purchasing the assets for £1.14bn.

February
February – Classic FM announces a major shake-up of the schedule, which will be rolled out in two parts – weekdays in late February and weekends a month later. Laurence Llewelyn-Bowen and Margherita Taylor join as part of the revamp and former Blur singer Alex James begins presenting a 100-part series called The A to Z of Classical Music. The changes will also see the introduction of a nightly two-hour jazz programme.
February – Huddersfield station Home 107.9 is relaunched as Pennine FM.The New Pennine FM,

March
17 March – Humphrey Lyttelton retires from BBC Radio 2, having presented The Best of Jazz for the last 40 years.
25 March – Rachel New joins Ed James as the new co-presenter of the Breakfast Show on Birmingham's 100.7 Heart FM.

April
 28 April – The Heart Network begins simulcasting some of its programmes from Heart 106.2 in London. There are now only ten hours of local programming from 100.7 Heart FM in Birmingham and Heart 106 in the East Midlands during weekdays and four hours on Saturday and Sunday.
April – Adrian Van Klaveren replaces Bob Shennan as Controller of BBC Radio 5 Live.

May
3 May – After 14 years on air, Manchester United Radio closes due to the club announcing that they had agreed a deal with local radio station Key 103.

June
 3 June – Tony Blackburn's weekend breakfast show on 102.2 Smooth Radio is to be syndicated across the rest of the Smooth network in England from 7 June.
 30 June – It is announced that Chris Tarrant will return to radio, hosting a weekly Saturday morning show for the GMG Radio's network of stations including London's 102.2 Smooth Radio, Real Radio (Scotland) and the North West's Century Radio. The show will air in direct competition to Jonathan Ross's show on BBC Radio 2. It began on 26 July.
 June – The Local Radio Company sells six stations, including Pennine FM which is now independently owned and run,

July
 27 July – As part of the BBC Proms season, BBC Radio 3 broadcasts the Doctor Who Prom live from the Albert Hall in London. Before the concert, the Doctor Who mini-episode Music of the Spheres receives its premiere.

August
 8 August – Thomas Quirk, the former managing director of Saga 105.2 FM (the predecessor to 105.2 Smooth Radio in Glasgow) criticises parent company GMG Radio's decision to sack six local Scottish presenters in favour of increased networking of shows from Smooth stations in London and Manchester. The station had operated a 24-hour schedule of local programming until August 2008.

September
 September – An interview on BBC Radio WM between Les Ross and writer and broadcaster Hardeep Singh Kohli is criticised for its awkwardness in the music magazine The Word and in The Guardian newspaper (suggesting that the interview ends up more like an Alan Partridge tribute act). In the interview, Ross asked Singh about his views on self-identity in terms of race; confused his humorous book on Indian food with a serious radio documentary by Singh discussing genocide during the partition of India; and then mistakenly referred to Singh's book as a TV series. Singh remained polite, if baffled, throughout, before terminating the interview after 4 minutes.
 September – After just six months, Classic FM scraps its nightly two-hour jazz programme.
 10 September – BBC Radio 4 broadcasts the play Lost Souls, a spin-off from the Doctor Who spin-off Torchwood
 29 September – Virgin Radio changes its name to Absolute Radio.

October
 4 October – BBC7 changes its name to BBC Radio 7.
 11 October – 
The closure of Channel 4 Radio is announced.
Any Questions? broadcasts from Winchester to mark its sixtieth anniversary.
 14 October – The Radio 4 programme You and Yours undergoes a large change of format, with two presenters being replaced by one. The breadth of topics covered is also extended to global problems as well as those closer to home.
 16 October – The Russell Brand Show prank calls row: An episode of the Russell Brand Show, co-hosted by fellow Radio 2 presenter Jonathan Ross is recorded for transmission at a later date. The show includes Brand and Ross leaving four prank messages on actor Andrew Sachs's answerphone including offensive remarks about his granddaughter and use of foul language. The programme is subsequently broadcast on Saturday 18 October, partially censored, having passed the various pre-transmission checks from the programme's editors. Initially the programme receives only a negligible number of complaints regarding Jonathan Ross' bad language; however, after the incident is reported a week later by The Mail on Sunday a public outcry soon ensues. The case is referred to both Ofcom and the BBC Trust and in the interim Ross and Brand are both suspended for 12 weeks from all BBC programmes pending investigation. Soon after these announcements Russell Brand announces his resignation from the BBC shortly followed by Radio 2 controller Lesley Douglas. Jonathan Ross is suspended from the BBC without pay for 12 weeks.
 27 October – Former ITV Central Tonight presenter Joanne Malin joins BBC WM. She will present a mid-morning show from February 2009.
 30 October – 
Original 106 is renamed The Coast following the sale of the station two months earlier to Celador.
Lesley Douglas's resignation is announced.

November
 21 November – London's 102.2 Smooth Radio announces that former BBC Radio Scotland and Pebble Mill presenter Paul Coia will replace Martin Collins as its Drivetime presenter.

December
No events.

Station debuts
8 January – 97.5 Smooth Radio
11 January – Birdsong Radio (2008–2009)
28 January – City Talk 105.9
15 February – Phonic FM
18 February – Exeter FM
15 March – Swindon 105.5
26 March – Oak FM
1 April – Rock Radio (North East)
4 April – Touch FM (Warwick)
May – Andover Sound
5 May – 106.1 Rock Radio
2 June – Q Radio
16 June – Nation Radio
24 June – NME Radio (2008–2013)
August – Rhubarb Radio
9 August – South Birmingham Community Radio
14 October – Radio Hartlepool
30 October – The Coast (radio station)
5 November – Focal Radio (2008–2009)
8 November – The Bay 102.8
7 December – 106.5 Central Radio
Unknown – Celtic Music Radio
Unknown – Somer Valley FM

Relaunching this year after a break of one month or more

8 October – Jazz FM (relaunched)

Closing this year

Programme debuts
 11 January – The Penny Dreadfuls Present... on BBC Radio 4 (2008–2009)
 26 February – Rudy's Rare Records on BBC Radio 4 (2008–2014)
 2 July – Cabin Pressure on BBC Radio 4 (2008–2014)
 29 September – Geoff Lloyd's Hometime Show (Geoff Lloyd with Annabel Port from 2015) on Virgin Radio (Absolute Radio from 2009) (2008–2017)
 1 October – The Media Show on BBC Radio 4 (2008–Present)
 27 October – The Strand on the BBC World Service (2008–2013)
 27 November – Act Your Age on BBC Radio 4 (2008–2010)

Continuing radio programmes

1940s
 Sunday Half Hour (1940–2018)
 Desert Island Discs (1942–Present)
 Woman's Hour (1946–Present)
 A Book at Bedtime (1949–Present)

1950s
 The Archers (1950–Present)
 The Today Programme (1957–Present)

1960s
 Farming Today (1960–Present)
 In Touch (1961–Present)
 The World at One (1965–Present)
 The Official Chart (1967–Present)
 Just a Minute (1967–Present)
 The Living World (1968–Present)
 The Organist Entertains (1969–2018)

1970s
 PM (1970–Present)
 Start the Week (1970–Present)
 You and Yours (1970–Present)
 I'm Sorry I Haven't a Clue (1972–Present)
 Good Morning Scotland (1973–Present)
 Newsbeat (1973–Present)
 File on 4 (1977–Present)
 Money Box (1977–Present)
 The News Quiz (1977–Present)
 Feedback (1979–Present)
 The Food Programme (1979–Present)
 Science in Action (1979–Present)

1980s
 Steve Wright in the Afternoon (1981–1993, 1999–Present)
 In Business (1983–Present)
 Sounds of the 60s (1983–Present)
 Loose Ends (1986–Present)

1990s
 The Moral Maze (1990–Present)
 Essential Selection (1991–Present)
 Wake Up to Wogan (1993–2009)
 Essential Mix (1993–Present)
 Up All Night (1994–Present)
 Wake Up to Money (1994–Present)
 Private Passions (1995–Present)
 The David Jacobs Collection (1996–2013)
 Sunday Night at 10 (1998–2013)
 In Our Time (1998–Present)
 Material World (1998–Present)
 Scott Mills (1998–Present)
 The Now Show (1998–Present)
 Jonathan Ross (1999–2010)

2000s
 BBC Radio 2 Folk Awards (2000–Present)
 Big John @ Breakfast (2000–Present)
 Go4It (2001–2009)
 The Jo Whiley Show (2001–2011)
 Kermode and Mayo's Film Review (2001–Present)
 The Big Toe Radio Show (2002–2011)
 A Kist o Wurds (2002–Present)
 Fighting Talk (2003–Present)
 Jeremy Vine (2003–Present)
 The Chris Moyles Show (2004–2012)
 Annie Mac (2004–Present)
 Elaine Paige on Sunday (2004–Present)
 Chris Evans Drivetime (2006–2009)
 The Bottom Line (2006–Present)
 The Christian O'Connell Breakfast Show (2006–Present)
 The Unbelievable Truth (2006–Present)
 The Radcliffe and Maconie Show (2007–Present)

Ending this year
 28 January – Jammin' (2001–2008)
 27 March – Sounds of the 70s (2000–2008, 2009–Present)
 25 September – The Geoff Show (2006–2008)
 25 October – The Russell Brand Show (2006–2008, 2010, 1013, 2017–Present)

Deaths
20 May – Margot Boyd, 94, actress
30 July – Peter Coke, 95, actor
29 August – Geoffrey Perkins, 55, comedy producer

References

Radio
British Radio, 2008 In
Years in British radio